Dawid Murek (born 24 July 1977) is a Polish professional volleyball coach and former player. He was a member of the Poland national team from 1996 to 2008, and a participant in the Olympic Games Athens 2004. He currently serves as head coach for Gwardia Wrocław.

Personal life
In 1999, he married Dorota. They have a daughter, Natalia (born 1999) who is also a professional volleyball player.

Honours

Clubs
 CEV Challenge Cup
  2011/2012 – with AZS Częstochowa

 National championships
 1996/1997  Polish Championship, with AZS Częstochowa
 1997/1998  Polish Cup, with AZS Częstochowa
 1998/1999  Polish Championship, with AZS Częstochowa
 2003/2004  Greek Championship, with Panathinaikos
 2008/2009  Polish Cup, with PGE Skra Bełchatów
 2008/2009  Polish Championship, with PGE Skra Bełchatów

Youth national team
 1996  CEV U20 European Championship
 1997  FIVB U21 World Championship

Individual awards
 2012: CEV Challenge Cup – Most Valuable Player

References

External links

 
 Player profile at PlusLiga.pl 
 Player profile at Volleybox.net
 
 

1977 births
Living people
People from Międzyrzecz
Sportspeople from Lubusz Voivodeship
Polish men's volleyball players
Polish volleyball coaches
Olympic volleyball players of Poland
Volleyball players at the 2004 Summer Olympics
Polish expatriate sportspeople in Greece
Expatriate volleyball players in Greece
Polish expatriate sportspeople in Italy
Expatriate volleyball players in Italy
AZS Częstochowa players
Panathinaikos V.C. players
Modena Volley players
Jastrzębski Węgiel players
Skra Bełchatów players
BKS Visła Bydgoszcz players
Gwardia Wrocław coaches
Outside hitters
Liberos